Bhim Kumar Singh, Bhim Yadav  popularly known as Magadh Samrat is an Indian politician and a member of Bihar Legislative Assembly of India. He was elected in 2000 as a member of Rashtriya Janata Dal from Nabinagar constituency in the Aurangabad district of Bihar.

Political life
 Yadav was elected from Nabinagar, Bihar in 2000 as a member of Rashtriya Janata Dal.
 In 2020 Bihar Legislative Assembly election Yadav prepared the elections for Nabinagar but at the time of election RJD denied for this constituency and given Goh constituency.

References

Living people
Rashtriya Janata Dal politicians
Bihar MLAs 2000–2005
Bihar MLAs 2020–2025
People from Aurangabad district, Bihar
Year of birth missing (living people)
People from Gaya district